Big Creek is a stream in Shannon and Texas counties in the Ozarks of southern Missouri. It is a tributary of the Current River.

Cedargrove lies just north of the confluence. Razor Hollow flows parallel to the lower reaches of Big Creek and enters the Current about two miles southeast of Big Creek's confluence.

Big Creek was so named on account of its size.

See also
List of rivers of Missouri

References

Rivers of Shannon County, Missouri
Rivers of Texas County, Missouri
Rivers of Missouri
Tributaries of the Current River (Ozarks)